Cristian Borruto (born 7 May 1987) is an Argentine futsal player who plays for Acqua & Sapone and the Argentine national futsal team.

References

External links
FIFA profile
Divisione Calcio a 5 profile

1987 births
Living people
Futsal forwards
Argentine people of Italian descent
Argentine men's futsal players
Argentine expatriate sportspeople in Italy